Facelina quadrilineata is a species of sea slug, an aeolid nudibranch, a marine gastropod mollusc in the family Facelinidae.

Distribution
This species has been reported from Japan where it is a common species.

Description 
This species has a pattern of four lines on the head. Facelina bilineata has been confused with this species in the past.

References

Facelinidae
Gastropods described in 1930